Witte Nunataks is an isolated nunataks about midway between the Sweeney Mountains and Hauberg Mountains in Palmer Land. Mapped by United States Geological Survey (USGS) from ground surveys and U.S. Navy air photos, 1961–67. Named by Advisory Committee on Antarctic Names (US-ACAN) for Paul F. Witte, construction mechanic with the Eights Station winter party in 1964.

Nunataks of Palmer Land